Nikolai Dmitrievich Tarakanov (born 19 May 1934, Central Black Earth Oblast) is a former Soviet military leader, doctor of technical sciences, member of the Presidium of the Russian Academy of Natural Sciences, founder and chairman of the Coordination Council of the Presidential Club Trust, Center for Social Protection of Persons with Disabilities, a member of the Union of Russian Writers, laureate of the M.A. Sholokhov International Literary Prize.

Tarakanov led a three-month operation to remove radioactive debris from the dangerous zones of the Chernobyl Nuclear Power Plant, as well as the restoration work after the Spitak earthquake. In his later life, he has become disabled due to consequences of his exposure to radiation in Chernobyl, and currently takes eight different medications to treat his radiation-related symptoms.

Early life and education
Tarakanov was born on the Don in the village of Gremyach'e (now - Khokholsky District, Voronezh Oblast) to a large peasant family. His father was Dmitry Tikhonovich Tarakanov, a veteran of the Russian Civil War, Winter War and World War II, and his mother was Natalia Vasilievna.

In 1953, he graduated from the Gremyachensk secondary school, then Kharkov Military Technical School. He served in the school, later in the Red Banner regiment of civil defense troops (the city of Meref) as commander of an electrical platoon.

In 1963, he graduated from the Kharkiv Automobile and Highway Institute with a degree in mechanical engineering. He served in Saratov as a regimental engineer. In 1967, he became a teacher at the Moscow Military School of Civil Defense. In 1972, he graduated from the adjuncture of the Kuibyshev Military Engineering Academy in Moscow.

Career

Tarakanov served as a senior specialist in the Military Technical Committee of the USSR Civil Defense Forces, then in the All-Union Scientific Research Institute of Civil Defense (including as First Deputy Chief of the Institute), Deputy Chief of the Civil Defense Staff of the RSFSR.

In 1986, he led an operation to remove highly radioactive elements from highly dangerous zones of the Chernobyl nuclear power plant.

In 1988, he led the rescue work after the Spitak earthquake.

In June 2019, in an interview with Dozhd TV channel, discussing the HBO serial Chernobyl, he said that he had lost the savings that he had saved for treatment.

According to Tarakanov, for his leadership of the operation on the Chernobyl accident, he was presented to the title of Hero of the Soviet Union. The general said this in an interview with journalist Alexey Pivovarov. But after, as Tarakanov says, the conflict with the chief of staff of the Kiev military district, General Fedorov, he was removed from the list.

Family 
Tarakanov married Zoya Ivanovna, a doctor. They had a daughter, Elena, who became a doctor.

Awards 

 Jubilee Medal "In Commemoration of the 100th Anniversary of the Birth of Vladimir Ilyich Lenin"
 Order "For Service to the Homeland in the Armed Forces of the USSR" III degree (1975), II degree (1987)
 Order of the Red Star (1982)
 Order of the Badge of Honour (1988)
 Order of Friendship (1995)
 Medal "Veteran of the Armed Forces of the USSR"
 Jubilee medals "40 Years of the Armed Forces of the USSR", "50 Years of the Armed Forces of the USSR", "60 Years of the Armed Forces of the USSR", "70 Years of the Armed Forces of the USSR", "60 Years of Victory in the Great Patriotic War 1941–1945", "65 Years of Victory in the Great Patriotic War 1941–1945", 
 Medal "For Impeccable Service" 1, 2 and 3 degrees
 Medal "75 years of civil defense"

Public awards 
 Order "For the Salvation of Life on Earth" (on the green ribbon)
 Order "Pride of Russia" (on a red ribbon)
 Order "For Service to the Fatherland" III and I degree (on tape)
 Order of "Civil Valor"
 Order "Defenders of the Fatherland" (white)
 Freeman (Order of the silver star "Public recognition")
 Order of Merit (Order of the Minister of Emergency Situations Shoigu)
 The gold medal of the winner of the M.A. Sholokhov International Literary Prize
 Sergey Yesenin's gold medal
 Gold Medal "Honorary Lawyer"
 Gold Medal "Winner of the Chernobyl Star Literary Award"

Medals For Loyalty to the Fatherland, Peacemaker, Russian Land, Medal Bunin, Silver Medal of the Russian Academy of Natural Sciences, For merits in the revival of the nation to them. Peter the Great, 20 years of the Chernobyl disaster, For loyalty to duty, For merits in the field of veterinary medicine, George Zhukov, 55 years of the Moscow city writers' organization, Afghanistan 40th Army, Medal. Roentgen (Germany).

In popular culture 
In the HBO television series Chernobyl, Tarakanov is played by the English actor Ralph Ineson. Tarakanov praised the series, calling it “brilliant work”, and also spoke highly of the portrayal by the British actor who played him in the series.

Publications 
Source – NNB Electronic Catalogs

Scientific articles 
 Maksimov, M. T., Tarakanov, N. D., Experience of Using Technical Means and Methods for Managing the Consequences of the Accident at the Chernobyl Nuclear Power Plant / Ed. ed. V.L. Govorova . - M.: stroiizdat, 1990. - 137 p.
 Tarakanov N. D. Complex mechanization of rescue and emergency rescue and recovery operations. - M.: Energoatomizdat, 1984. - 304 p. - (Civil Defense of the USSR).

Books 
 Tarakanov N. D. Two tragedies of the XX century. [The explosion of the nuclei. reactor at Chernobyl. NPP and the Spitak earthquake]: Dokum. to lead - M.: Owls. writer, 1992. - 431 p. - 
 Tarakanov N. D. Living memory. reflections on time and on human destiny ... / comp. A. Pekarsky. - Ed. 2nd, add. [and pre.]. - M.: Voenizdat Branch, 2006. - 488 p. -  
 Tarakanov N. D. Notes of the Russian General. Fav. works: In 3 tons. - M.: 4th fil. Military Publishing, 1998.
 Vol. 1: Hell's End
 Vol. 2: Coffins on the shoulders
 Vol. 3: The Abyss
 Tarakanov N. D. Notes of the Russian General. [selected works]. - M.: Branch of Voenizdat, 2007.
 Vol. 1: Hell's End
 Vol. 2: And the Earth opened up
 Vol. 3: The Catcher in the Lie ...
 N. D. Tarakanov. And the two destinies became one fate ...: a literary collection of arts. - M.: Voenizdat branch, 2008. - 175 p. -  
 Tarakanov N. D. When the mountains cry. - M.: Dignity, 2014. - 294 p. - 
 Tarakanov N. D. Hope of Russia. - M.: B.i., 2004. - 472 p. - BBK Ш6 (2 = Р) 75-491
 Tarakanov N. D. Under the constellation of the Bull. Field. meditations. - M.: Inter-Libra, 2003. - 279 p. -  (err.) 
 N. D. Tarakanov. Break: [Earthquake in Armenia, 7 Dec. 1988]. - M.: Military Publishing, 1991. - 192 p. - 
 Tarakanov N. D. Russian knot. Prince thinking - 2nd ed., [Add.]. - M.: Military Publishing, 2002. - 615 p. -  
 Tarakanov N. D. Chernobyl notes, or Reflections on morality. - M.: Military Publishing, 1989. - 208 p. - 
 Tskhinval: a chronicle of Georgian aggression. documentary collection / under total. ed. N. D. Tarakanova. - Ed. 2nd, add. - M.: Presidential Club "Trust", 2009. - 272 p. -  
 "Chernobyl Signal"; "The dead judge the living"; "The dead are not silent"; “At the turn of the millennium. Fracture "; "Fracture"; "Graphite"; "Soldiers of the Fatherland"; “Vivat to President Putin!”; "President Putin in the new version"; "Sonkino Lake"

Television appearances 
 Air Force TV program
 Chernobyl: Chronicle of Silence
 Good Morning (with Arina Sharapova, Larisa Verbitskaya)
 Evening Voronezh (1992)
 Go!, Klass! TV (commissioned by ORT, 1997)
 Hero of the Day with Svetlana Sorokina (NTV, 1998)
 Witness of the Century (NTV, 2000)
 Forgive with Andrey Rasbash (Channel One, 2005)
 Church and Peace (June 21, 2014)
 Male and Female (ORT - Channel 1, February 20, 2015)

References

External links 
 Nikolai Dmitrievich Tarakanov Presidential Club "Trust"
 Tkachenko V. Nikolay Dmitrievich Tarakanov: The fate of the hero of Chernobyl and Spitak Pseudology.
 Tarakanov N. D. The people are waiting for "debriefing" Soviet Russia.

1934 births
Chernobyl liquidators
Soviet military personnel
Recipients of the Order "For Service to the Homeland in the Armed Forces of the USSR", 3rd class
Living people
Recipients of the Order "For Service to the Homeland in the Armed Forces of the USSR", 2nd class